Metzia mesembrinum is a species of cyprinid in the genus Metzia. The species was found on Taiwan proper until the 1920s, when its range was reduced to the outlying island of Kinmen.

References

Cyprinidae
Cyprinid fish of Asia
Fish of Taiwan
Fish of Singapore